Bethuadahari railway station is a rural Indian railway station of the Sealdah–Ranaghat–Lalgola branch line in Eastern Railway zone. The station situated in Nadia district in the Indian state of West Bengal. It serves Bethuadahari, Nakashipara and the surrounding areas. Few passengers, EMU and Express trains pass over the railway station.

History 
Initially the Calcutta-Kusthia line of Eastern Bengal Railway was opened to traffic in 1862. The Ranaghat–Lalgola branch line was established in 1905 as an extension of Sealdah–Ranaghat line. This railway station situated at Bethudahari town. The rail distance between Bethuadahari and Sealdah is 126 km. (96 miles). After the electrification and inauguration of double track by the Indian Railways, this Station was modified and reconstructed into three platforms.

Trains 
22 trains pass through this station. Lalgola Passengers, Hazarduari Express and Bhagirathi Express stop there.

Electrification 
The Krishnanagar – Lalgola Section has been electrified on the 2010.

References 

Railway stations in Nadia district
Sealdah railway division
Kolkata Suburban Railway stations